Kevin McKenna (born 1980) is a retired Canadian soccer player.

Kevin McKenna may also refer to:

 Kevin McKenna (Irish republican), Irish Republican Army chief of staff
 Kevin McKenna (basketball) (born 1959), basketball player